Progressive Slovene Women of America (PSWA), or Progresivne Slovenke Amerike, is an ethnic fraternal benefit and social organization for Slovene immigrant women and their descendants in the United States. Founded in 1934, it is headquartered in Cleveland, Ohio. The membership is drawn primarily from the Cleveland area.

See also 
Slovenian Americans

External links
PSWA article in Encyclopedia of Cleveland History
Slovenian Americans

Organizations based in Cleveland
Slovene-American culture in Cleveland
Slovene-American culture in Ohio
Slovene-American history
History of women in Ohio
1934 establishments in Ohio
1930s in Cleveland